A system distribution is a collection of software designed to be installed into a computer and may refer to:

 Guix System Distribution, intertwined with cross-platform package manager GNU Guix
Berkeley Software Distribution
Linux distribution